Sims Ellison (March 10, 1967 – June 6, 1995) was an American guitarist, who played for Pariah. In 1995, Ellison killed himself due to depression about the music industry. Today there is a charity for local Austin musicians who suffer from mental health and suicidal issues called the Sims Foundation.

Biography
Ellison was born into a San Antonio musical family. He and his brother Kyle formed a heavy metal band in high school called Pariah.  After a few albums released with different record labels they signed with Geffen Records in 1991 recording their notable album To Mock A Killingbird that was released in 1993. In May 1995 Geffen Records dumped the band after which Ellison went into a major depression.

Death
On June 6, 1995 Ellison died after he shot himself with a gun in his Austin apartment. He was 28 years old.

SIMS Foundation
The SIMS Foundation was founded by former Pariah manager Wayne Nagle shortly after Sims`death, in honor of him. This charity helps local Austin musicians who have mental health issues by supporting them and their families.

In October 2021, the SIMS Foundation launched a campaign to treat musicians' mental health. The idea first arose in the immediate aftermath of the 2017 Las Vegas shooting and was expanded during the COVID-19 pandemic when, in late 2020, Ellison's father launched The Founders Challenge to address mental health in the musical stage.

Personal life
Ellison dated actress Renée Zellweger for a few years.

Discography

Studio albums
1989 - Rattle Your Skull (Not On Label)
1992 - Make Believe (Sick Kids Productions)
1993  - To Mock A Killingbird (Geffen Records)

Tribute albums
2015 - It`s All Over Now Baby Blue (SIMS Foundation)

References

External links

Sims Foundation

1967 births
1995 deaths
1995 suicides
American rock guitarists
American heavy metal guitarists
Musicians from Austin, Texas
Musicians from San Antonio
20th-century American guitarists
Suicides by firearm in Texas